Daimanazuru Kenji (born January 16, 1977 as Kenji Omae) is a former sumo wrestler from Kawakami, Yoshino District, Nara, Japan. He began his professional career in 1992, and spent a total of 19 tournaments in the top two divisions, peaking at maegashira 16 in 2006. He retired at the end of the January 2010 tournament and has chosen to work outside of the Sumo Association.

Career
He made his professional debut in May 1992, joining Asahiyama stable, then run by the former wrestler Wakafutase. In 1997 his stablemaster died suddenly and for the remainder of his career he was coached by former ozeki Daiju. He initially fought under his own surname of Omae, before adopting the shikona of Futasewaka in 1994. He switched to his familiar name of Daimanazuru at the beginning of 2000.

He reached sekitori status in November 2003, after more than eleven years in the unsalaried divisions, by winning the makushita tournament championship or yusho with a perfect 7-0 record. He was the first wrestler from Asahiyama stable to be promoted to jūryō since the new head coach took over in 1997.  He made his jūryō debut alongside future yokozuna Hakuho. After two losing scores in January and March 2004 he slipped back to makushita, but he returned to jūryō in January 2005. He made steady progress, rising slowly up the jūryō division with a succession of 8-7 scores, which was enough to earn him promotion to the top makuuchi division for the July 2006 tournament. It had taken him 85 tournaments to reach makuuchi from his professional debut, the seventh slowest ever. However, his single tournament there saw him win only two bouts, against veterans Buyuzan and Tochisakae, and he was demoted straight back to jūryō.

In September 2007 he suffered an eye injury and had to withdraw on the 4th day, resulting in demotion back to the unsalaried makushita division. By July 2008 he had fallen to Makushita 26, the same rung on the ladder as fellow former top division wrestler Takahama. He scored six wins against one loss in that tournament however, and took part in an eight-way playoff for the makushita championship. He missed out on his third title, eliminated in the semifinal stage by Yamamotoyama. Restricted by a nagging shoulder injury, a series of mediocre performances after that saw him fall to Makushita 54 for the January 2010 basho, his lowest rank since entering the makushita division at the end of 1997. Despite recording 4 wins against 3 losses, he announced his retirement after the tournament at the age of 33. He did not fight in enough sekitori tournaments to qualify for a toshiyori (elder) position, and left the sumo world to work in a Tokyo based firm.

Fighting style
Daimanazuru had a straightforward fighting style, with around 70% of his wins being either yorikiri (force out) or oshidashi (push out).  He preferred a migi-yotsu grip on the mawashi, with his left hand outside and right hand inside his opponent's arms.

Family
He announced his engagement in May 2006.

Career record

See also
Glossary of sumo terms
List of past sumo wrestlers

References

External links
 

1977 births
Living people
Japanese sumo wrestlers
Sumo people from Nara Prefecture